"Right Place, Wrong Time" is a song by American musician Dr. John.  It was the first single from his sixth album, In the Right Place, and became his biggest hit single.

During the summer of 1973, the song peaked at number nine on the U.S. Billboard Hot 100.  It is ranked as the 24th biggest hit of 1973.  In Canada, the song reached number six.

Some of the lines came from contributions by Bob Dylan, Bette Midler and Doug Sahm. A verse lyric from the song ("Just need a little brain salad surgery/got to cure my insecurity") was the inspiration for the title of the album Brain Salad Surgery by the English progressive rock band Emerson, Lake & Palmer, replacing the working title of Whip Some Skull on Yer. Both titles are slang expressions for fellatio.

Personnel
Dr. John – lead vocals 

The Meters

Art Neville – organ 
Leo Nocentelli – lead guitar 
George Porter Jr. – bass guitar 
Ziggy Modeliste – drums 

Additional personnel 

Gary Brown – saxophone 
Robbie Montgomery – backing vocals 
Jessie Smith – backing vocals 
David Spinozza – guitar solo 
Allen Toussaint – piano, percussion, rhythm guitar, horn arrangements

Chart history

Weekly charts

Year-end charts

Use in media
"Right Place, Wrong Time" was included in the soundtrack of the 2000 comedy film Lucky Numbers. The song was featured in an episode of American Horror Story: Coven, an episode of That 70’s Show and in the movies Dazed and Confused and Fun with Dick and Jane (2005). In 2008, the song was included in How I Met Your Mother'''s fourth season ending "Right place, right time". It also appeared over the opening credits in the film Sahara, as well as the trailer for the second season of Fargo. 

The song was included in the soundtrack to the 2010 video game Skate 3. It was also included in  Black Lightning (S3:E7). 

The song's intro was sampled by Dr. Dre and used in the intro to the movie Deep Cover. 

It was used in trailers for the television series, Poker Face.

Cover versions
The Jon Spencer Blues Explosion covered the song, releasing it on Acme Plus, the UK version of Xtra-Acme USA. This version appeared on the Scream 2 soundtrack, and the film's title, together with the names of stars Neve Campbell and Jada Pinkett, can be heard shouted several times during the song's intro.

The Screamin' Cheetah Wheelies covered the song on their album Magnolia (Capricorn Records, 1996).

James Booker covered the song on his album Gonzo: Live 1976 as a medley with "Desitively Bonnaroo".

Dave Matthews Band covered the song with special guests Preservation Hall Jazz Band as a tribute to Dr. John, following his death, at Alpine Valley Music Theatre on July 5, 2019.

B.B. King and Bonnie Raitt covered the song for the soundtrack to the film Air America''.

References

External links
  

1973 songs
1973 singles
Dr. John songs
Atco Records singles